This is a list of the bird species recorded in Kyrgyzstan. The avifauna of Kyrgyzstan include a total of 425 species.

This list's taxonomic treatment (designation and sequence of orders, families and species) and nomenclature (common and scientific names) follow the conventions of The Clements Checklist of Birds of the World, 2022 edition. The family accounts at the beginning of each heading reflect this taxonomy, as do the species counts found in each family account. Accidental species are included in the total species count for Kyrgyzstan.

The following tag has been used to highlight accidentals. The commonly occurring native species are untagged.

(A) Accidental - a species that rarely or accidentally occurs in Kyrgyzstan
(I) Introduced - a species introduced to Kyrgyzstan as a consequence, direct or indirect, of human actions

Ducks, geese, and waterfowl
Order: AnseriformesFamily: Anatidae

Anatidae includes the ducks and most duck-like waterfowl, such as geese and swans. These birds are adapted to an aquatic existence with webbed feet, flattened bills, and feathers that are excellent at shedding water due to an oily coating.

 Bar-headed goose, Anser indicus
 Graylag goose, Anser anser
 Greater white-fronted goose, Anser albifrons
 Lesser white-fronted goose, Anser erythropus
 Taiga bean-goose, Anser fabalis
 Red-breasted goose, Branta ruficollis
 Mute swan, Cygnus olor
 Tundra swan, Cygnus columbianus (A)
 Whooper swan, Cygnus cygnus
 Ruddy shelduck, Tadorna ferruginea
 Common shelduck, Tadorna tadorna
 Cotton pygmy-goose, Nettapus coromandelianus (A)
 Baikal teal, Sibirionetta formosa (A)
 Garganey, Spatula querquedula
 Northern shoveler, Spatula clypeata
 Gadwall, Mareca strepera
 Eurasian wigeon, Mareca penelope
 Mallard, Anas platyrhynchos
 Northern pintail, Anas acuta
 Green-winged teal, Anas crecca
 Marbled teal, Marmaronetta angustirostris (A)
 Red-crested pochard, Netta rufina
 Common pochard, Aythya ferina
 Ferruginous duck, Aythya nyroca
 Tufted duck, Aythya fuligula
 Greater scaup, Aythya marila (A)
 Velvet scoter, Melanitta fusca
 Stejneger's scoter, Melanitta stejnegeri (A)
 Long-tailed duck, Clangula hyemalis (A)
 Common goldeneye, Bucephala clangula
 Smew, Mergellus albellus
 Common merganser, Mergus merganser
 Red-breasted merganser, Mergus serrator
 White-headed duck, Oxyura leucocephala

Pheasants, grouse, and allies
Order: GalliformesFamily: Phasianidae

The Phasianidae are a family of terrestrial birds which consists of quails, partridges, snowcocks, francolins, spurfowls, tragopans, monals, pheasants, peafowls and jungle fowls. In general, they are plump (although they vary in size) and have broad, relatively short wings.

 Willow ptarmigan, Lagopus lagopus
 Black grouse, Lyrurus tetrix
 Gray partridge, Perdix perdix
 Daurian partridge, Perdix dauurica 
 Ring-necked pheasant, Phasianus colchicus
 Tibetan snowcock, Tetraogallus tibetanus  
 Himalayan snowcock, Tetraogallus himalayensis 
 Common quail, Coturnix coturnix 
 Chukar, Alectoris chukar
 Rock partridge, Alectoris graeca (I)

Flamingos
Order: PhoenicopteriformesFamily: Phoenicopteridae

Flamingos filter-feed on shellfish and algae. Their oddly shaped beaks are specially adapted to separate mud and silt from the food they consume and, uniquely, are used upside-down.

 Greater flamingo, Phoenicopterus roseus

Grebes
Order: PodicipediformesFamily: Podicipedidae

Grebes are small to medium-large freshwater diving birds. They have lobed toes and are excellent swimmers and divers. However, they have their feet placed far back on the body, making them quite ungainly on land.

 Little grebe, Tachybaptus  ruficollis 
 Horned grebe, Podiceps auritus 
 Red-necked grebe, Podiceps grisegena
 Great crested grebe, Podiceps cristatus  
 Eared grebe, Podiceps nigricollis

Pigeons and doves
Order: ColumbiformesFamily: Columbidae

Pigeons and doves are stout-bodied birds with short necks and short slender bills with a fleshy cere.

 Rock pigeon, Columba livia 
 Hill pigeon, Columba rupestris  
 Snow pigeon, Columba leuconota 
 Stock dove, Columba oenas 
 Yellow-eyed pigeon, Columba eversmanni 
 Common wood-pigeon, Columba palumbus 
 European turtle-dove, Streptopelia turtur 
 Oriental turtle-dove, Streptopelia orientalis  
 Eurasian collared-dove, Streptopelia decaocto  
 Laughing dove, 	Streptopelia senegalensis

Sandgrouse
Order: PterocliformesFamily: Pteroclidae

Sandgrouse have small, pigeon like heads and necks, but sturdy compact bodies. They have long pointed wings and sometimes tails and a fast direct flight. Flocks fly to watering holes at dawn and dusk. Their legs are feathered down to the toes.

 Pallas's sandgrouse, Syrrhaptes paradoxus
 Pin-tailed sandgrouse, Pterocles alchata  
 Black-bellied sandgrouse, Pterocles orientalis

Bustards
Order: OtidiformesFamily: Otididae

Bustards are large terrestrial birds mainly associated with dry open country and steppes in the Old World. They are omnivorous and nest on the ground. They walk steadily on strong legs and big toes, pecking for food as they go. They have long broad wings with "fingered" wingtips and striking patterns in flight. Many have interesting mating displays.

 Great bustard, Otis tarda (A)
 Macqueen's bustard, Chlamydotis macqueenii 
 Little bustard, Tetrax tetrax

Cuckoos
Order: CuculiformesFamily: Cuculidae

The family Cuculidae includes cuckoos, roadrunners and anis. These birds are of variable size with slender bodies, long tails and strong legs.

 Common cuckoo, Cuculus canorus 
 Oriental cuckoo, Cuculus optatus

Nightjars
Order: CaprimulgiformesFamily: Caprimulgidae

Nightjars are medium-sized nocturnal birds that usually nest on the ground. They have long wings, short legs and very short bills. Most have small feet, of little use for walking, and long pointed wings. Their soft plumage is camouflaged to resemble bark or leaves.

 Eurasian nightjar, Caprimulgus europaeus

Swifts
Order: CaprimulgiformesFamily: Apodidae

Swifts are small birds which spend the majority of their lives flying. These birds have very short legs and never settle voluntarily on the ground, perching instead only on vertical surfaces. Many swifts have long swept-back wings which resemble a crescent or boomerang.

 Alpine swift, Apus melba
 Common swift, Apus apus

Rails, gallinules, and coots
Order: GruiformesFamily: Rallidae

Rallidae is a large family of small to medium-sized birds which includes the rails, crakes, coots and gallinules. Typically they inhabit dense vegetation in damp environments near lakes, swamps or rivers. In general they are shy and secretive birds, making them difficult to observe. Most species have strong legs and long toes which are well adapted to soft uneven surfaces. They tend to have short, rounded wings and to be weak fliers.

 Water rail, Rallus aquaticus
 Corn crake, Crex crex
 Spotted crake, Porzana porzana
 Eurasian moorhen, Gallinula chloropus
 Eurasian coot, Fulica atra
 Little crake, Zapornia parva 
 Baillon's crake, Zapornia pusilla

Cranes
Order: GruiformesFamily: Gruidae

Cranes are large, long-legged and long-necked birds. Unlike the similar-looking but unrelated herons, cranes fly with necks outstretched, not pulled back. Most have elaborate and noisy courting displays or "dances".

 Demoiselle crane, Anthropoides virgo
 Common crane, Grus grus

Thick-knees
Order: CharadriiformesFamily: Burhinidae

The thick-knees are a group of largely tropical waders in the family Burhinidae. They are found worldwide within the tropical zone, with some species also breeding in temperate Europe and Australia. They are medium to large waders with strong black or yellow-black bills, large yellow eyes and cryptic plumage. Despite being classed as waders, most species have a preference for arid or semi-arid habitats.

 Eurasian thick-knee, Burhinus oedicnemus

Stilts and avocets
Order: CharadriiformesFamily: Recurvirostridae

Recurvirostridae is a family of large wading birds, which includes the avocets and stilts. The avocets have long legs and long up-curved bills. The stilts have extremely long legs and long, thin, straight bills.

 Black-winged stilt, Himantopus himantopus 
 Pied avocet, Recurvirostra avosetta

Ibisbill
Order: CharadriiformesFamily: Ibidorhynchidae

The ibisbill is related to the waders, but is sufficiently distinctive to be a family unto itself. The adult is grey with a white belly, red legs, a long down curved bill, and a black face and breast band.

 Ibisbill, Ibidorhyncha struthersii

Oystercatchers
Order: CharadriiformesFamily: Haematopodidae

The oystercatchers are large and noisy plover-like birds, with strong bills used for smashing or prising open molluscs.

 Eurasian oystercatcher, Haematopus ostralegus

Plovers and lapwings
Order: CharadriiformesFamily: Charadriidae

The family Charadriidae includes the plovers, dotterels and lapwings. They are small to medium-sized birds with compact bodies, short, thick necks and long, usually pointed, wings. They are found in open country worldwide, mostly in habitats near water.

 Black-bellied plover, Pluvialis squatarola
 European golden-plover, Pluvialis apricaria (A)
 American golden-plover, Pluvialis dominica (A)
 Pacific golden-plover, Pluvialis fulva (A)
 Northern lapwing, Vanellus vanellus
 Sociable lapwing, Vanellus gregarius 
 White-tailed lapwing, Vanellus leucurus (A)
 Lesser sand-plover, Charadrius mongolus
 Greater sand-plover, Charadrius leschenaultii
 Caspian plover, Charadrius asiaticus
 Kentish plover, Charadrius alexandrinus
 Common ringed plover, Charadrius hiaticula
 Little ringed plover, Charadrius dubius
 Eurasian dotterel, Charadrius morinellus

Sandpipers and allies
Order: CharadriiformesFamily: Scolopacidae

Scolopacidae is a large diverse family of small to medium-sized shorebirds including the sandpipers, curlews, godwits, shanks, tattlers, woodcocks, snipes, dowitchers and phalaropes. The majority of these species eat small invertebrates picked out of the mud or soil. Variation in length of legs and bills enables multiple species to feed in the same habitat, particularly on the coast, without direct competition for food.

 Whimbrel, Numenius phaeopus
 Slender-billed curlew, Numenius tenuirostris (A)
 Eurasian curlew, Numenius arquata
 Bar-tailed godwit, Limosa lapponica
 Black-tailed godwit, Limosa limosa
 Ruddy turnstone, Arenaria interpres
 Ruff, Calidris pugnax
 Broad-billed sandpiper, Calidris falcinellus
 Curlew sandpiper, Calidris ferruginea
 Temminck's stint, Calidris temminckii
 Long-toed stint, Calidris subminuta 
 Red-necked stint, Calidris ruficollis (A)
 Sanderling, Calidris alba
 Dunlin, Calidris alpina
 Little stint, Calidris minuta
 Jack snipe, Lymnocryptes minimus
 Eurasian woodcock, Scolopax rusticola
 Solitary snipe, Gallinago solitaria
 Common snipe, Gallinago gallinago
 Pin-tailed snipe, Gallinago stenura (A)
 Terek sandpiper, Xenus cinereus
 Red-necked phalarope, Phalaropus lobatus
 Red phalarope, Phalaropus fulicarius (A)
 Common sandpiper, Actitis hypoleucos
 Green sandpiper, Tringa ochropus
 Spotted redshank, Tringa erythropus
 Common greenshank, Tringa nebularia
 Marsh sandpiper, Tringa stagnatilis
 Wood sandpiper, Tringa glareola
 Common redshank, Tringa totanus

Pratincoles and coursers
Order: CharadriiformesFamily: Glareolidae

Glareolidae is a family of wading birds comprising the pratincoles, which have short legs, long pointed wings and long forked tails, and the coursers, which have long legs, short wings and long, pointed bills which curve downwards.

 Collared pratincole, Glareola pratincola
 Black-winged pratincole, Glareola nordmanni

Skuas and jaegers
Order: CharadriiformesFamily: Stercorariidae

The family Stercorariidae are, in general, medium to large birds, typically with grey or brown plumage, often with white markings on the wings. They nest on the ground in temperate and arctic regions and are long-distance migrants.

Parasitic jaeger, Stercorarius parasiticus (A)

Gulls, terns, and skimmers
Order: CharadriiformesFamily: Laridae

Laridae is a family of medium to large seabirds, the gulls, terns, and skimmers. Gulls are typically grey or white, often with black markings on the head or wings. They have stout, longish bills and webbed feet. Terns are a group of generally medium to large seabirds typically with grey or white plumage, often with black markings on the head. Most terns hunt fish by diving but some pick insects off the surface of fresh water. Terns are generally long-lived birds, with several species known to live in excess of 30 years.

 Black-legged kittiwake, Rissa tridactyla (A)
 Slender-billed gull, Chroicocephalus genei
 Black-headed gull, Chroicocephalus ridibundus
 Little gull, Hydrocoloeus minutus
 Pallas's gull, Ichthyaetus ichthyaetus
 Common gull, Larus canus
 Herring gull, Larus argentatus (A)
 Caspian gull, Larus cachinnans
 Lesser black-backed gull, Larus fuscus
 Little tern, Sternula albifrons
 Gull-billed tern, Gelochelidon nilotica
 Caspian tern, Hydroprogne caspia
 Black tern, Chlidonias niger
 White-winged tern, Chlidonias leucopterus
 Whiskered tern, Chlidonias hybrida
 Common tern, Sterna hirundo

Loons
Order: GaviiformesFamily: Gaviidae

Loons, known as divers in Europe, are a group of aquatic birds found in many parts of North America and northern Europe. They are the size of a large duck or small goose, which they somewhat resemble when swimming, but to which they are completely unrelated.

 Arctic loon, Gavia arctica

Storks
Order: CiconiiformesFamily: Ciconiidae

Storks are large, long-legged, long-necked, wading birds with long, stout bills. Storks are mute, but bill-clattering is an important mode of communication at the nest. Their nests can be large and may be reused for many years. Many species are migratory.

 Black stork, Ciconia nigra 
 White stork, Ciconia ciconia

Cormorants and shags
Order: SuliformesFamily: Phalacrocoracidae

Phalacrocoracidae is a family of medium to large coastal, fish-eating seabirds that includes cormorants and shags. Plumage coloration varies, with the majority having mainly dark plumage, some species being black-and-white and a few being colorful.

 Pygmy cormorant, Microcarbo pygmeus
 Great cormorant, Phalacrocorax carbo

Pelicans
Order: PelecaniformesFamily: Pelecanidae

Pelicans are large water birds with a distinctive pouch under their beak. As with other members of the order Pelecaniformes, they have webbed feet with four toes.

 Great white pelican, Pelecanus onocrotalus
 Dalmatian pelican, Pelecanus crispus

Herons, egrets, and bitterns
Order: PelecaniformesFamily: Ardeidae

The family Ardeidae contains the bitterns, herons and egrets. Herons and egrets are medium to large wading birds with long necks and legs. Bitterns tend to be shorter necked and more wary. Members of Ardeidae fly with their necks retracted, unlike other long-necked birds such as storks, ibises and spoonbills.

 Great bittern, Botaurus stellaris
 Little bittern, Ixobrychus minutus
 Gray heron, Ardea cinerea
 Purple heron, Ardea purpurea
 Great egret, Ardea alba
 Chinese pond-heron, Ardeola bacchus (A)
 Black-crowned night-heron, Nycticorax nycticorax

Ibises and spoonbills
Order: PelecaniformesFamily: Threskiornithidae

Threskiornithidae is a family of large terrestrial and wading birds which includes the ibises and spoonbills. They have long, broad wings with 11 primary and about 20 secondary feathers. They are strong fliers and despite their size and weight, very capable soarers.

 Glossy ibis, Plegadis falcinellus 
 Eurasian spoonbill, Platalea leucorodia

Osprey
Order: AccipitriformesFamily: Pandionidae

The family Pandionidae contains only one species, the osprey. The osprey is a medium-large raptor which is a specialist fish-eater with a worldwide distribution.

 Osprey, Pandion haliaetus

Hawks, eagles, and kites
Order: AccipitriformesFamily: Accipitridae

Accipitridae is a family of birds of prey, which includes hawks, eagles, kites, harriers, and Old World vultures. These birds have powerful hooked beaks for tearing flesh from their prey, strong legs, powerful talons and keen eyesight.

 Bearded vulture Gypaetus barbatus
 Egyptian vulture, Neophron percnopterus 
 European honey-buzzard, Pernis apivorus (A)
 Oriental honey-buzzard, Pernis ptilorhynchus
 Cinereous vulture, Aegypius monachus 
 Himalayan griffon, Gyps himalayensis 
 Eurasian griffon, Gyps fulvus 
 Short-toed snake-eagle, Circaetus gallicus
 Greater spotted eagle, Clanga clanga
 Booted eagle, Hieraaetus pennatus
 Steppe eagle, Aquila nipalensis
 Imperial eagle, Aquila heliaca
 Golden eagle, Aquila chrysaetos
 Bonelli's eagle, Aquila fasciata
 Eurasian marsh-harrier, Circus aeruginosus
 Hen harrier, Circus cyaneus
 Pallid harrier, Circus macrourus 
 Montagu's harrier, Circus pygargus
 Shikra, Accipiter badius
 Levant sparrowhawk, Accipiter brevipes (A)
 Eurasian sparrowhawk, Accipiter nisus
 Northern goshawk, Accipiter gentilis
 Black kite, Milvus migrans
 White-tailed eagle, Haliaeetus albicilla
 Pallas's fish-eagle, Haliaeetus leucoryphus
 Rough-legged hawk, Buteo lagopus
 Common buzzard, Buteo buteo
 Eastern buzzard, Buteo japonicus (A)
 Long-legged buzzard, Buteo rufinus
 Upland buzzard, Buteo hemilasius

Owls
Order: StrigiformesFamily: Strigidae

The typical owls are small to large solitary nocturnal birds of prey. They have large forward-facing eyes and ears, a hawk-like beak and a conspicuous circle of feathers around each eye called a facial disk.

 Eurasian scops-owl, Otus scops 
 Pallid scops-owl, Otus brucei
 Eurasian eagle-owl, Bubo bubo
 Snowy owl, Bubo scandiacus 
 Northern hawk owl, Surnia ulula
 Little owl, Athene noctua
 Tawny owl, Strix aluco 
 Long-eared owl, Asio otus 
 Short-eared owl, Asio flammeus
 Boreal owl, Aegolius funereus

Hoopoes
Order: BucerotiformesFamily: Upupidae

Hoopoes have black, white and orangey-pink colouring with a large erectile crest on their head.

 Eurasian hoopoe, Upupa epops

Kingfishers
Order: CoraciiformesFamily: Alcedinidae

Kingfishers are medium-sized birds with large heads, long, pointed bills, short legs and stubby tails.

 Common kingfisher, Alcedo atthis

Bee-eaters
Order: CoraciiformesFamily: Meropidae

The bee-eaters are a group of near passerine birds in the family Meropidae. Most species are found in Africa but others occur in southern Europe, Madagascar, Australia and New Guinea. They are characterised by richly coloured plumage, slender bodies and usually elongated central tail feathers. All are colourful and have long downturned bills and pointed wings, which give them a swallow-like appearance when seen from afar.

 Blue-cheeked bee-eater, Merops persicus
 European bee-eater, Merops apiaster

Rollers
Order: CoraciiformesFamily: Coraciidae

Rollers resemble crows in size and build, but are more closely related to the kingfishers and bee-eaters. They share the colourful appearance of those groups with blues and browns predominating. The two inner front toes are connected, but the outer toe is not.

 European roller, Coracias garrulus

Woodpeckers
Order: PiciformesFamily: Picidae

Woodpeckers are small to medium-sized birds with chisel-like beaks, short legs, stiff tails and long tongues used for capturing insects. Some species have feet with two toes pointing forward and two backward, while several species have only three toes. Many woodpeckers have the habit of tapping noisily on tree trunks with their beaks.

 Eurasian wryneck, Jynx torquilla
 Eurasian three-toed woodpecker, Picoides tridactylus
 Great spotted woodpecker, Dendrocopos major
 White-winged woodpecker, Dendrocopos leucopterus

Falcons and caracaras
Order: FalconiformesFamily: Falconidae

Falconidae is a family of diurnal birds of prey. They differ from hawks, eagles, and kites in that they kill with their beaks instead of their talons.

 Lesser kestrel, Falco naumanni Vulnerable
 Eurasian kestrel, Falco tinnunculus 
 Red-footed falcon, Falco vespertinus
 Merlin, Falco columbarius
 Eurasian hobby, Falco subbuteo
 Laggar falcon, Falco jugger (A)
 Saker falcon, Falco cherrug
 Gyrfalcon, Falco rusticolus
 Peregrine falcon, Falco peregrinus

Old World orioles
Order: PasseriformesFamily: Oriolidae

The Old World orioles are colourful passerine birds. They are not related to the New World orioles.

 Eurasian golden oriole, Oriolus oriolus (A)
 Indian golden oriole, Oriolus kundoo

Monarch flycatchers
Order: PasseriformesFamily: Monarchidae

The monarch flycatchers are small to medium-sized insectivorous passerines which hunt by flycatching.

 Indian paradise-flycatcher, Terpsiphone paradisi

Shrikes
Order: PasseriformesFamily: Laniidae

Shrikes are passerine birds known for their habit of catching other birds and small animals and impaling the uneaten portions of their bodies on thorns. A typical shrike's beak is hooked, like a bird of prey.

 Red-backed shrike, Lanius collurio
 Red-tailed shrike, Lanius phoenicuroides
 Isabelline shrike, Lanius isabellinus 
 Long-tailed shrike, Lanius schach
 Northern shrike, Lanius borealis
 Great gray shrike, Lanius excubitor
 Lesser gray shrike, Lanius minor

Crows, jays, and magpies
Order: PasseriformesFamily: Corvidae

The family Corvidae includes crows, ravens, jays, choughs, magpies, treepies, nutcrackers and ground jays. Corvids are above average in size among the Passeriformes, and some of the larger species show high levels of intelligence.

 Eurasian magpie, Pica pica
 Turkestan ground-jay, Podoces panderi
 Eurasian nutcracker, Nucifraga caryocatactes
 Red-billed chough, Pyrrhocorax pyrrhocorax  
 Yellow-billed chough, Pyrrhocorax graculus  
 Eurasian jackdaw, Corvus monedula
 Rook, Corvus frugilegus
 Carrion crow, Corvus corone
 Hooded crow, Corvus cornix 
 Common raven, Corvus corax

Tits, chickadees, and titmice
Order: PasseriformesFamily: Paridae

The Paridae are mainly small stocky woodland species with short stout bills. Some have crests. They are adaptable birds, with a mixed diet including seeds and insects.

 Coal tit, Periparus ater
 Rufous-naped tit, Periparus rufonuchalis
 Willow tit, Poecile montana
 Azure tit, Cyanistes cyanus  
 Great tit, Parus major

Penduline-tits
Order: PasseriformesFamily: Remizidae

The penduline-tits are a group of small passerine birds related to the true tits. They are insectivores.

 Black-headed penduline-tit, Remiz macronyx  
 White-crowned penduline-tit, Remiz coronatus

Larks
Order: PasseriformesFamily: Alaudidae

Larks are small terrestrial birds with often extravagant songs and display flights. Most larks are fairly dull in appearance. Their food is insects and seeds.

 Horned lark, Eremophila alpestris
 Greater short-toed lark, Calandrella brachydactyla 
 Hume's lark, Calandrella acutirostris
 Bimaculated lark, Melanocorypha bimaculata  
 Calandra lark, Melanocorypha calandra  
 Black lark, Melanocorypha yeltoniensis  
 Asian short-toed lark, Alaudala cheleensis (A)
 Turkestan short-toed lark, Alaudala heinei
 White-winged lark, Alauda leucoptera
 Eurasian skylark, Alauda arvensis
 Oriental skylark, Alauda gulgula 
 Crested lark, Galerida cristata

Bearded reedling
Order: PasseriformesFamily: Panuridae

This species, the only one in its family, is found in reed beds throughout temperate Europe and Asia.
 
 Bearded reedling, Panurus biarmicus

Reed warblers and allies
Order: PasseriformesFamily: Acrocephalidae

The members of this family are usually rather large for "warblers". Most are rather plain olivaceous brown above with much yellow to beige below. They are usually found in open woodland, reedbeds, or tall grass. The family occurs mostly in southern to western Eurasia and surroundings, but it also ranges far into the Pacific, with some species in Africa.

 Booted warbler, Iduna caligata
 Sykes's warbler, Iduna rama  
 Eastern olivaceous warbler, Iduna pallida  
 Upcher's warbler, Hippolais languida  
 Moustached warbler, Acrocephalus melanopogon
 Sedge warbler, Acrocephalus schoenobaenus
 Paddyfield warbler, Acrocephalus agricola
 Blyth's reed warbler, Acrocephalus dumetorum
 Eurasian reed warbler, Acrocephalus scirpaceus
 Great reed warbler, Acrocephalus arundinaceus
 Clamorous reed warbler, Acrocephalus stentoreus

Grassbirds and allies
Order: PasseriformesFamily: Locustellidae

Locustellidae are a family of small insectivorous songbirds found mainly in Eurasia, Africa, and the Australian region. They are smallish birds with tails that are usually long and pointed, and tend to be drab brownish or buffy all over.

 Pallas's grasshopper warbler, Helopsaltes certhiola
 Savi's warbler, Locustella luscinioides
 Common grasshopper-warbler, Locustella naevia

Swallows
Order: PasseriformesFamily: Hirundinidae

The family Hirundinidae is adapted to aerial feeding. They have a slender streamlined body, long pointed wings and a short bill with a wide gape. The feet are adapted to perching rather than walking, and the front toes are partially joined at the base.

 Bank swallow, Riparia riparia
 Pale sand martin, Riparia diluta  
 Eurasian crag-martin, Ptyonoprogne rupestris  
 Barn swallow, Hirundo rustica
 Red-rumped swallow, Hirundo daurica
 Common house-martin, Delichon urbicum

Leaf warblers
Order: PasseriformesFamily: Phylloscopidae

Leaf warblers are a family of small insectivorous birds found mostly in Eurasia and ranging into Wallacea and Africa. The species are of various sizes, often green-plumaged above and yellow below, or more subdued with greyish-green to greyish-brown colours.

 Wood warbler, Phylloscopus sibilatrix
 Yellow-browed warbler, Phylloscopus inornatus
 Hume's warbler, Phylloscopus humei
 Brooks's leaf warbler, Phylloscopus subviridis (A)
 Pallas's leaf warbler, Phylloscopus proregulus
 Sulphur-bellied warbler, Phylloscopus griseolus  
 Plain leaf warbler, Phylloscopus neglectus
 Willow warbler, Phylloscopus trochilus
 Mountain chiffchaff, Phylloscopus sindianus
 Common chiffchaff, Phylloscopus collybita
 Green warbler, Phylloscopus nitidus
 Greenish warbler, Phylloscopus trochiloides

Bush warblers and allies
Order: PasseriformesFamily: Scotocercidae

The members of this family are found throughout Africa, Asia, and Polynesia. Their taxonomy is in flux, and some authorities place some genera in other families.

 Scrub warbler, Scotocerca inquieta  
 Cetti's warbler, Cettia cetti

Long-tailed tits
Order: PasseriformesFamily: Aegithalidae

Long-tailed tits are a group of small passerine birds with medium to long tails. They make woven bag nests in trees. Most eat a mixed diet which includes insects.

 White-browed tit-warbler, Leptopoecile sophiae 
 Long-tailed tit, Aegithalos longicaudus

Sylviid warblers, parrotbills, and allies
Order: PasseriformesFamily: Sylviidae

The family Sylviidae is a group of small insectivorous passerine birds. They mainly occur as breeding species, as the common name implies, in Europe, Asia and, to a lesser extent, Africa. Most are of generally undistinguished appearance, but many have distinctive songs.

 Garden warbler, Sylvia borin
 Barred warbler, Curruca nisoria
 Lesser whitethroat, Curruca curruca
 Eastern Orphean warbler, Curruca crassirostris  
 Asian desert warbler, Curruca nana 
 Menetries's warbler, Curruca mystacea
 Greater whitethroat, Curruca communis

Kinglets
Order: PasseriformesFamily: Regulidae

The kinglets, also called crests, are a small group of birds often included in the Old World warblers, but frequently given family status because they also resemble the titmice.

 Goldcrest, Regulus regulus

Wallcreeper
Order: PasseriformesFamily: Tichodromidae

The wallcreeper is a small bird related to the nuthatch family, which has stunning crimson, grey and black plumage.

 Wallcreeper, Tichodroma muraria

Nuthatches
Order: PasseriformesFamily: Sittidae

Nuthatches are small woodland birds. They have the unusual ability to climb down trees head first, unlike other birds which can only go upwards. Nuthatches have big heads, short tails and powerful bills and feet.

 Eastern rock nuthatch, Sitta tephronota

Treecreepers
Order: PasseriformesFamily: Certhiidae

Treecreepers are small woodland birds, brown above and white below. They have thin pointed down-curved bills, which they use to extricate insects from bark. They have stiff tail feathers, like woodpeckers, which they use to support themselves on vertical trees.

 Eurasian treecreeper, Certhia familiaris
 Bar-tailed treecreeper, Certhia himalayana

Wrens
Order: PasseriformesFamily: Troglodytidae

The wrens are mainly small and inconspicuous except for their loud songs. These birds have short wings and thin down-turned bills. Several species often hold their tails upright. All are insectivorous.

 Eurasian wren, Troglodytes troglodytes

Dippers
Order: PasseriformesFamily: Cinclidae

Dippers are a group of perching birds whose habitat includes aquatic environments in the Americas, Europe and Asia. They are named for their bobbing or dipping movements.

 White-throated dipper, Cinclus cinclus
 Brown dipper, Cinclus pallasii'

Starlings
Order: PasseriformesFamily: Sturnidae

Starlings are small to medium-sized passerine birds. Their flight is strong and direct and they are very gregarious. Their preferred habitat is fairly open country. They eat insects and fruit. Plumage is typically dark with a metallic sheen.

 European starling, Sturnus vulgaris Rosy starling, Pastor roseus Common myna, Acridotheres tristisThrushes and allies
Order: PasseriformesFamily: Turdidae

The thrushes are a group of passerine birds that occur mainly in the Old World. They are plump, soft plumaged, small to medium-sized insectivores or sometimes omnivores, often feeding on the ground. Many have attractive songs.

 White's thrush, Zoothera aurea (A)
 Mistle thrush, Turdus viscivorus Song thrush, Turdus philomelos Redwing, Turdus iliacus Eurasian blackbird, Turdus merula Fieldfare, Turdus pilaris Black-throated thrush, Turdus atrogularis 
 Red-throated thrush, Turdus ruficollisOld World flycatchers
Order: PasseriformesFamily: Muscicapidae

Old World flycatchers are a large group of small passerine birds native to the Old World. They are mainly small arboreal insectivores. The appearance of these birds is highly varied, but they mostly have weak songs and harsh calls.

 Spotted flycatcher, Muscicapa striata Rufous-tailed scrub-robin, Cercotrichas galactotes European robin, Erithacus rubecula White-throated robin, Irania gutturalis Common nightingale, Luscinia megarhynchos Bluethroat, Luscinia svecica Blue whistling-thrush, Myophonus caeruleus Little forktail, Enicurus scouleri 
 Himalayan rubythroat, Calliope pectoralis Rusty-tailed flycatcher, Ficedula ruficauda (A)
 Red-breasted flycatcher, Ficedula parva (A)
 Plumbeous redstart, Phoenicurus fuliginosus (A)
 Rufous-backed redstart, Phoenicurus erythronotus 
 White-capped redstart, 	Phoenicurus leucocephalus 
 Blue-capped redstart, Phoenicurus caeruleocephalus 
 Common redstart, Phoenicurus phoenicurus 
 White-winged redstart, Phoenicurus erythrogaster Black redstart, Phoenicurus ochruros Rufous-tailed rock-thrush, Monticola saxatilis Blue rock-thrush, Monticola solitarius 
 Whinchat, Saxicola rubetra (A)
 White-throated bushchat, Saxicola insignis 
 Siberian stonechat, Saxicola maurus  
 Pied bushchat, Saxicola caprata Northern wheatear, Oenanthe oenanthe Isabelline wheatear, Oenanthe isabellina Desert wheatear, Oenanthe deserti  
 Eastern black-eared wheatear, Oenanthe melanoleuca 
 Pied wheatear, Oenanthe pleschanka Variable wheatear, Oenanthe picata 
 Finsch's wheatear, Oenanthe finschii (A)
 Persian wheatear, Oenanthe chrysopygiaWaxwings
Order: PasseriformesFamily: Bombycillidae

The waxwings are a group of birds with soft silky plumage and unique red tips to some of the wing feathers. In the Bohemian and cedar waxwings, these tips look like sealing wax and give the group its name. These are arboreal birds of northern forests. They live on insects in summer and berries in winter.

 Bohemian waxwing, Bombycilla garrulusAccentors
Order: PasseriformesFamily: Prunellidae

The accentors are in the only bird family, Prunellidae, which is completely endemic to the Palearctic. They are small, fairly drab species superficially similar to sparrows.

 Alpine accentor, Prunella collaris Altai accentor, Prunella himalayana  
 Brown accentor, Prunella fulvescens  
 Black-throated accentor, Prunella atrogularisOld World sparrows
Order: PasseriformesFamily: Passeridae

Old World sparrows are small passerine birds. In general, sparrows tend to be small, plump, brown or grey birds with short tails and short powerful beaks. Sparrows are seed eaters, but they also consume small insects.

 Saxaul sparrow,  Passer ammodendri (A)
 House sparrow,  Passer domesticus Spanish sparrow, Passer hispaniolensis  
 Eurasian tree sparrow, Passer montanus  
 Rock sparrow, Petronia petronia  
 White-winged snowfinch, Montifringilla nivalis White-rumped snowfinch, Montifringilla taczanowskiiWagtails and pipits
Order: PasseriformesFamily: Motacillidae

Motacillidae is a family of small passerine birds with medium to long tails. They include the wagtails, longclaws and pipits. They are slender, ground feeding insectivores of open country.

 Gray wagtail,  Motacilla cinerea Western yellow wagtail, Motacilla flava Citrine wagtail, Motacilla citreola  
 White wagtail,  Motacilla alba Richard's pipit, Anthus richardi Tawny pipit, Anthus campestris Meadow pipit, Anthus pratensis Tree pipit, Anthus trivialis Olive-backed pipit, Anthus hodgsoni (A)
 Red-throated pipit, Anthus cervinus Water pipit, Anthus spinoletta Rock pipit, Anthus petrosusFinches, euphonias, and allies
Order: PasseriformesFamily: Fringillidae

Finches are seed-eating passerine birds, that are small to moderately large and have a strong beak, usually conical and in some species very large. All have twelve tail feathers and nine primaries. These birds have a bouncing flight with alternating bouts of flapping and gliding on closed wings, and most sing well.

 Common chaffinch, Fringilla coelebs Brambling, Fringilla montifringilla White-winged grosbeak, Mycerobas carnipes 
 Hawfinch, Coccothraustes coccothraustes Common rosefinch, Carpodacus erythrinus Red-mantled rosefinch, Carpodacus rhodochlamys Blyth's rosefinch, Carpodacus grandis  
 Great rosefinch, Carpodacus rubicilla  
 Long-tailed rosefinch, Carpodacus sibiricus Red-fronted rosefinch, Carpodacus puniceus Eurasian bullfinch, Pyrrhula pyrrhula Crimson-winged finch, Rhodopechys sanguineus 
 Trumpeter finch, Bucanetes githaginea Mongolian finch, Bucanetes mongolicus 
 Plain mountain finch, Leucosticte nemoricola  
 Black-headed mountain finch, Leucosticte brandti Desert finch, Rhodospiza obsoleta 
 European greenfinch, Chloris chloris Twite, Linaria flavirostris Eurasian linnet, Linaria cannabina Common redpoll, Acanthis flammea Red crossbill, Loxia curvirostra European goldfinch, Carduelis carduelis
 Fire-fronted serin, Serinus pusillus  
 Eurasian siskin, Spinus spinus 
 

Longspurs and snow buntingsOrder: PasseriformesFamily: Calcariidae

The Calcariidae are a group of passerine birds which had been traditionally grouped with the New World sparrows, but differ in a number of respects and are usually found in open grassy areas.

 Lapland longspur, Calcarius lapponicus
 Snow bunting, Plectrophenax nivalis (A)

Old World buntingsOrder: PasseriformesFamily': Emberizidae

The emberizids are a large family of passerine birds. They are seed-eating birds with distinctively shaped bills. Many emberizid species have distinctive head patterns.

 Black-headed bunting, Emberiza melanocephala Red-headed bunting, Emberiza bruniceps 
 Corn bunting, Emberiza calandra Chestnut-eared bunting, Emberiza fucata (A)
 Rock bunting, Emberiza cia Godlewski's bunting, Emberiza godlewskii Meadow bunting, Emberiza cioides 
 White-capped bunting, Emberiza stewarti 
 Yellowhammer, Emberiza citrinella Pine bunting, Emberiza leucocephalos 
 Gray-necked bunting, Emberiza buchanani 
 Ortolan bunting, Emberiza hortulana Pallas's bunting, Emberiza pallasi (A)
 Reed bunting, Emberiza schoeniclus Yellow-breasted bunting, Emberiza aureola Little bunting, Emberiza pusilla (A)
 Rustic bunting, Emberiza rustica''

See also
List of birds
Lists of birds by region

References

External links
 Birds of Kyrgyzstan (in Russian)

Kyrgyzstan
Kyrgyzstan
'
birds